Fluid Dynamics Research is a bimonthly peer-reviewed scientific journal covering all fields of fluid dynamics. It is published by IOP Publishing on behalf of the Japan Society of Fluid Mechanics. The editor-in-chief is Genta Kawahara (Osaka University). According to the Journal Citation Reports, the journal has a 2021 impact factor of 1.500.

Every year, one article published in the previous year is awarded the FDR Prize, to recognize its outstanding quality.

References

External links 
 

Publications established in 1986
English-language journals
Fluid dynamics journals
Bimonthly journals
IOP Publishing academic journals